Collision Course is a 2021 movie directed by Bolanle Austen-Peters. It was featured as the closing film for the 10th Africa International Film Festival in November 2021 and was the opening film for the Athen’s Nollywood Travel Film Festival in May 2022.

Plot 
The film simultaneously tells the story of a police officer struggling to make ends meet and an upcoming artiste. The police officer sets up a roadblock to collect bribes. At the roadblock, he meets the artiste and mistakenly shoots him dead. The events that follow would eventually lead to the police officer's arrest.

Cast 

 Chioma Chukwuka Akpotha
 Ade Laoye
 Kenneth Okolie
 Daniel Etim Effiong
 Bimbo Manuel
 Gregory Ojefua
 Bamike Olawunmi-Adenibuyan
 Kalu Ikeagwu
 Nobert Young

Awards 
The film was the winner of Best Movie West Africa in Africa Magic Viewers’ Choice Awards in 2022.

References

External links
 

2021 films
Nigerian crime drama films
English-language Nigerian films
Africa Magic Viewers' Choice Awards winners